Brad Hawkins may refer to:

Brad Hawkins (actor) (born 1976), American actor
Brad Hawkins (American football) (born 1998), American football player
Brad Hawkins (politician) (born 1975), American politician